The Presbyterian Church of Korea (TongHap) is a mainline Protestant denomination based in South Korea; it currently has the second largest membership of any Presbyterian denomination in the world. It is affiliated with its daughter denomination, the Korean Presbyterian Church in America (KPCA) in the United States, which adopted the "Korean Presbyterian Church Abroad" as its new name in 2009.

Presbyterianism in Korea was reconstructed after World War II in 1947. The church adopted the name the Reformed Church in Korea. In the 1950s the church suffered tensions because the issues of theology, ecumenism and worship. In 1959 Presbyterian Church of Korea broke into two equal sections. This church and The Presbyterian Church in Korea (HapDong) church separated. In 1984 the church celebrated the 100th anniversary of Presbyterianism in Korea. The church is an ecumenical denomination. Membership is about 2.1 million and has 6,000 congregations in 56 presbyteries in 2004.

The denomination is a member of the World Communion of Reformed Churches and World Council of Churches.
 
The Apostles Creed and the Westminster Confession are the official recognised confessions.

According to the World Council of Churches there are 2.85 million members in 8,200 congregations.

Cause of formation 
The Korean Presbyterian Church split for the third time (1951, 1953, and 1959) when the church divided for and against Park Hyung-
Ryong (박형룡 朴亨龍, 1897 ~ 1978), president of the Presbyterian Seminary Society of the General Assembly. The anti-Park party is called 대한예수교장로회(통합)'Tonghap' (the united body) and the pro-Park party is called 대한예수교장로회(합동)'Hapdong' (the union body). 
The divisions from all three splits during the 50s still exist. The divisions from the third split between Tonghap and Hapdong respectively are still the largest Presbyterian dominations in South Korea .

References

External links
Official English-language website
Official Korean-language website

Members of the World Council of Churches
Christian organizations established in 1959
Presbyterian denominations in South Korea
Presbyterian denominations established in the 20th century